Sean Banan inuti Seanfrika (en:Sean Banan inside Seanfrica) is a 2012 Swedish comedy film starring comedian Sean Samadi as Sean Banan, Dr. Alban, Kikki Danielsson and Johannes Brost.

Plot 
A guy named Sean Banan heads to Africa with a diva to record a music video. What was supposed to be a simple trip turns out to be a crazy road trip with boat hunts, wild animals and many strange people. Losing all his money after a mysterious stockbroker goes missing, they go on an adventure around Africa to find the mysterious stockbroker and his money.

Cast 
 Sean Banan as himself
 Kikki Danielsson as herself
 Dr. Alban as himself
 Johannes Brost as Swedish Ambassador
 Armando Sando Vilanculos as Director
 António Rocha as Hotel Manager
 Fátima Pedro as Fatima
 Benedito Duna as Entourage
 Inácio Duna as Entourage
 Constantino Mateus as Entourage
 Francisco Ihaca as Albans Bodyguard
 Inácio Ricardo Chirute as Postal Worker
 Miguel Alfredo Manjate as Postal Worker
 Jerónimo Eduardo as Postal Worker

Reception 
The movie was unanimously panned by Swedish reviewers, several describing it as among the worst films produced in Sweden. Sydsvenskan called it an insult to paying audiences
 and Ronny Svensson of TV4 describing it as utterly untalented.

References

External links

"Sean Banan inuti Seanfrika". Swedish film database

2012 films
2012 comedy films
Swedish comedy films
Films set in Africa
2010s Swedish films
2010s Swedish-language films